Nae Caranfil (also Nicolae Caranfil) (born 7 September 1960) is a Romanian film director and screenwriter.

Career
Born in Bucharest, Nae Caranfil is the son of important Romanian film historian and critic Tudor Caranfil. He graduated in 1984 from the Caragiale Academy of Theatrical Arts and Cinematography (UNATC) in Bucharest, where he has also taught as a professor.

In the beginning of his career he directed only short films: Venice in September (1983), Thirty Years of Insomnia (1984), and Backstage (1988). Caranfil made his feature film debut with E Pericoloso Sporgersi (1993) and continued with road movie comedy Asfalt tango starring Charlotte Rampling (1996) and with Dolce far niente (1998). His movie Filantropica (2002) was a critical success and increased Caranfil's popularity. Some consider Nae Caranfil to be the best Romanian director of the 1990s. Nae Caranfil wrote the screenplay for all his movies and worked on the music for the first two of them (E Pericoloso Sporgersi and Asfalt-tango).

In 2011, Caranfil began production on the English-language feature film Closer to the Moon. An early version of the script entitled Alice în Țara Tovarășilor (Alice in the Land of Comrades) won a grant of €576,600 from the National Centre of Cinema in 2007. The story is based on the 1959 bank robbery in Communist Romania for which a group known as the Ioanid Gang were convicted and sentenced to death. As they awaited execution, the prisoners were forced to film a reenactment of their crime. Closer to the Moon stars Mark Strong, Vera Farmiga, Harry Lloyd, Joe Armstrong, Christian McKay, Tim Plester, Anton Lesser, and Allan Corduner. Filming took place in Bucharest in the autumn of 2011. Closer to the Moon premiered at the Making Waves: New Romanian Cinema festival at Lincoln Center on 29 November 2013. Variety called the film "a surprisingly entertaining black comedy."

Awards
2009 Gopo Award for The Rest Is Silence
2003 Würzburg International Filmweekend - Audience Award for Filantropica
2002 Mons International Festival of Love Films - Young European Jury Award for Filantropica
2002 Paris Film Festival - Public Prize for Filantropica
2002 Wiesbaden goEast - Special Jury Award for Filantropica
1998 Namur International Festival of French-Speaking Film - Golden Bayard Award for Best Screenplay for Dolce far niente
1993 Montpellier Mediterranean Film Festival - Critics Award for E Pericoloso Sporgersi

Filmography as director
2016 6,9 pe Scara Richter
2013 Closer to the Moon
2007 The Rest Is Silence
2002 Filantropica
1998 Dolce far niente
1996 Asphalt Tango
1993 E pericoloso sporgersi
1983  Frumos e în septembrie la Veneția

References

External links
 
 Romanian National Cinematography Center page for Nae Caranfil

1960 births
Living people
Film people from Bucharest
Caragiale National University of Theatre and Film alumni
Romanian film directors
Romanian screenwriters
Romanian male film actors